Cam Lộ is a rural district of Quảng Trị province in the North Central Coast region of Vietnam. As of 2003 the district had a population of 46,231. The district covers an area of 347 km². The district capital lies at Cam Lộ.

Administration subdivisions
The district includes a townlet Cam Lộ (capital) and eight rural communes (xã): Cam Thành, Cam An, Cam Thanh, Cam Thuỷ, Cam Tuyền, Cam Hiếu, Cam Chính, Cam Nghĩa.

References

Districts of Quảng Trị province